Emily McLaughlin (December 1, 1928 – April 26, 1991) was an American actress, known for her long-standing role as original character Nurse Jessie Brewer on the daytime soap opera General Hospital from 1963 until 1991.

Early life
McLaughlin was born in White Plains, New York, where her father, Frederick C. McLaughlin, was mayor. She was educated at Middlebury College and after studying drama began performing in Broadway and off-Broadway productions.

Career

McLaughlin made her television debut in 1959, with regular role of Eileen Seaton on the daytime soap opera Young Doctor Malone. In 1961, she moved to Hollywood and began appearing with guest starring roles on anthology dramas The Twilight Zone, Studio One and Kraft Television Theatre.

General Hospital
From 1963 to 1991, McLaughlin starred in the soap opera General Hospital as Nurse Jessie Brewer. She was cast as one of the original leading actresses on the series. Registered nurse Jessie Brewer spoke the opening line of the premiere episode, "Seventh floor, nurses station", a phrase that became a staple in the show's early years. The series' original premise centered around the drama of Brewer and Dr. Steve Hardy's personal lives and experiences at General Hospital.

Awards
In 1974, McLaughlin earned a nomination for a Golden Globe Award for Best Actress – Television Series Drama for her role. She became the first and only actress nominated for a Golden Globe Award for a role on the daytime soap.

Her character in General Hospital was seen less and less during the 1980s. Although she wanted the steady work and to keep her job, her failing health made it difficult. She was eventually demoted to day-player status, but still retained her billing at the top of the cast crawl, behind only John Beradino as Dr. Steve Hardy. Towards the end of her life, she was only shown on the serial a few times a year, with her last appearance on the show aired on March 1, 1991, when Jessie attended the funeral of a character named Dawn Winthrop. On April 26, 1991, McLaughlin died of cancer, aged 62. She is interred next to second husband Jeffrey Hunter in the Glen Haven Memorial Park cemetery in Sylmar, California.

After her death, co-star John Beradino announced at the end of a General Hospital episode that McLaughlin had died. However, the character Jessie Brewer was never written out or referred to; she simply disappeared without explanation. Not until years later, during an anniversary episode, did Dr. Steve Hardy mention that Jessie had died.

Personal life
McLaughlin was married to actor Robert Lansing from 1956–1968, with whom she had a son. After their divorce, she married actor Jeffrey Hunter in February 1969. Three months after the marriage, Hunter died of a cerebral hemorrhage on May 27, aged 42.

On April 26, 1991, McLaughlin died of cancer, aged 62. She is interred next to second husband Jeffrey Hunter in the Glen Haven Memorial Park cemetery in Sylmar, California.

In 1994, McLaughlin's daughter Mary Ann Anderson wrote and published Portrait of a Soap Star: The Emily McLaughlin Story.

Filmography

Further reading
Don Keefer, "Emily McLaughlin's Life Story". Afternoon TV. September 1975, pp. 48–61.

References

External links

1928 births
1991 deaths
Actresses from New York (state)
American soap opera actresses
American television actresses
Middlebury College alumni
People from White Plains, New York
Deaths from cancer in California
20th-century American actresses